Baroness Scott may refer to:

Jane Scott, Baroness Scott of Bybrook (born 1947), British politician
Rosalind Scott, Baroness Scott of Needham Market (born 1957), British politician